The 1961 Sheffield City Council election was held on 11 May 1961, with a third up for election plus a double vacancy in Owlerton. The results were largely a reversal of the previous election; a higher turnout  - 35%, up significantly from the previous year's low of 25% - brought a much stronger Labour result with the seats they'd lost the preceding year held comfortably. All seats were contested and successfully defended this year, seeing no change in the make-up of the council.

Election result

This result has the following consequences for the total number of seats on the Council after the elections:

Ward results

By-elections between 1961 and 1962

References

1961 English local elections
1961
1960s in Sheffield